State Route 360 (SR 360) is a  state highway in the southern portion of Mineral County, Nevada, United States. The route connects the former town of Basalt to the rest of Mineral County. A road has been in the place of SR 360 since 1919, and became State Route 10 by 1929.

Route description
From there, the highway proceeds north for about  before turning northeast to roughly parallel the Mineral–Esmeralda county line. The route winds around some mountains and valleys, including following the southeast tip of the Excelsior Mountains.

History

A route approximating the alignment of State Route 360 appears on maps as early as 1919.  This road paralleled the path of the Southern Pacific Railroad from Rhodes through Basalt and into California.  By 1929, the road had been designated as a part of State Route 10.  The southern , between the California state line and Basalt, had been paved by 1936.  This section became part of US 6 when it was extended through Nevada in 1937.  The remainder of SR 10 was paved by 1955.

Once the highway was paved, it remained relatively unchanged for several years.  In 1976, Nevada began a renumbering of its state highways.  In the route reassignment process, the portion of SR 10 concurrent with US 6 no longer carried a state highway number; the remainder of the highway north of Basalt became State Route 360.  This action took place on July 1, 1976, and was first seen on state maps with the 1978 edition.

Major intersections

References

360
Transportation in Mineral County, Nevada